"The Way I Want to Touch You" is a song written by Toni Tennille, which started the professional recording careers for Captain & Tennille. It was certified gold by the Recording Industry Association of America (R.I.A.A) for sales of one million units.  Captain & Tennille recorded a Spanish version, entitled "Como Yo Quiero Sentirte" which was released as a single in 1975. It was taken from the Spanish version of their debut album Por Amor Viviremos. The duo also re-recorded "The Way I Want To Touch You" in 1995 for their album, 20 Years of Romance.

Background
Tennille explained that she wrote the song about how she really felt about Daryl “The Captain” Dragon. She had written it in 1972, during the year when she and Daryl toured with The Beach Boys.
 
In September 1973, Toni and Daryl were performing at The Smokehouse Restaurant in Encino, California and two men from a small F.M. station were in the audience one night. They asked Toni and Daryl if they had any records, and at the time, they hadn’t. This inspired the duo to record two songs, “The Way I Want To Touch You” and “Disney Girls” at a small recording studio (the size of a garage) located in the San Fernando Valley. A man by the name of Morgan Cavett, a songwriter and producer who gained his first major success by writing for the musical group Steppenwolf assisted Daryl and Toni  with producing these recordings. On the liner notes of the “Love Will Keep Us Together” album a special thanks was given to Morgan Cavett for introducing the Captain to Tennille. 
 
Daryl and Toni initially pressed a few copies and gave them to several small F.M. stations in the Los Angeles area. Soon the stations were calling the duo saying that they were getting strong feedback. Daryl and Toni decided to go ahead and spend $250 to have 500 vinyl copies pressed. They sent samples to radio stations and then drove off in a camper truck to visit 130 stations in 22 states to promote the single. The original vinyl pressings were issued on Butterscotch Castle Records, a label name created by Captain and Tennille. Soon afterwards, additional copies were released and distributed by Joyce Records. 
 
Three Los Angeles D.J.’s Wink Martindale and Gary Owens of KMPC and Johnny Hayes of KRLA began talking about the song and promoting it out of merit. The record finally caught the attention of A&M Records, who bought the single and re-released it on their label in 1974. This time it became a minor chart maker on the west coast, but was only qualified as a regional hit.

Cash Box said that "this is the single that impressed the label enough to give the duo the shot that produced “Love Will Keep Us Together." Record World called it a "compelling Toni Tennille love ballad." Record World also reviewed the 1973 single, calling it "a  sensational 'ladies record' that should immediately garner tremendous pop and MOR airplay with super vocals, romantically explicit lyrics and a genuine hit sound."

Personnel
Daryl Dragon (The Captain) - keyboards, bass, arrangements
Jane Tennille, Louisa Tennille, Melissa Tennille, Toni Tennille - background vocals
Ed Greene - drums

Chart performance
After the worldwide success of the single "Love Will Keep Us Together," A&M Records re-released "The Way I Want To Touch You" in September 1975. This time the song reached #4 on the Billboard Hot 100 and #3 on the Cash Box Top 100. It was their second #1 hit on the Adult Contemporary charts of both the U.S. and Canada.

Weekly charts

Year-end charts

Other notable versions
Lonette McKee on her 1974 album Lonette 
Shirley Bassey on her 1976 album Love, Life and Feelings
Ray Conniff on the 1976 album I Write The Songs
The Laurie Bower Singers on the 2002 album “Evergreen”
Carmen Rodgers on her 2004 album “Free”
Matt Catingub Orchestra of Hawaii on the 2006 album “Return to Romance” featuring vocals by Toni Tennille

See also
List of number-one adult contemporary singles of 1975 (U.S.)

References

External links
 

1975 singles
Captain & Tennille songs
1972 songs
Songs written by Toni Tennille
A&M Records singles